Peter Lawrence Chesson Jr. (born December 9, 1978 in Far Hills, New Jersey) is an American race car driver who most recently competed in the Indy Racing League IndyCar Series.

Chesson rode go-karts and motorbikes while growing up on a horse farm in Bedminster, New Jersey.

Career

Chesson made his professional debut in sprint cars in 1998 and from 2000 to 2003 was a regular in the World of Outlaws winged sprint car series. In 2004 he suddenly decided to change his career path and drove in the IRL's Infiniti Pro Series winning three races and finishing fourth in series points despite missing three races. He was announced as the driver for Hemelgarn Racing's car in the IndyCar Series in 2006 with new backing from NBA star Carmelo Anthony. The partnership was dubbed "Carmelo Hemelgarn Racing". The deal was brokered through the IRL's new marketing partner, Simmons-Abramson Marketing, made up of rock legend Gene Simmons and entertainment industry vet Richard Abramson. Chesson started the first 4 races of the season, the last being the Indianapolis 500, where he and teammate Jeff Bucknum tangled on the second lap and finished in the last two positions. Chesson has numerous tattoos, including one of the 2006 Indianapolis 500 logo that he had applied in public at the Speedway during the final day of qualifying. Since the demise of his deal with Hemelgarn, Chesson did not return to the Indycar Series until the end of the 2007 season when, in another Simmons/Abramson brokered deal, Chesson was announced as the second driver for Roth Racing alongside team owner Marty Roth with both cars sponsored by fashion label Dussault Apparel. He made his 2007 debut at the final race of the season at Chicagoland Speedway and finished 19th after mechanical gremlins sidelined him for over 100 laps.

Racing record

American open–wheel racing results
(key) (Races in bold indicate pole position)

Indy Lights

IndyCar

Indianapolis 500

External links
P. J. Chesson's MySpace page
P. J. Chesson open wheel racing statistics at ChampCarStats.com

1978 births
Indianapolis 500 drivers
Indy Lights drivers
IndyCar Series drivers
Living people
People from Bedminster, New Jersey
People from Far Hills, New Jersey
Racing drivers from New Jersey
Sportspeople from Somerset County, New Jersey
World of Outlaws drivers